The 1926–27  Hong Kong First Division League season was the 19th since its establishment.

League table

References
1926–27 Hong Kong First Division table (RSSSF)

Hong Kong
Hong Kong
Hong Kong First Division League seasons
1926 in Hong Kong
1927 in Hong Kong